Eyes of Love is a 1951 West German drama film directed by Alfred Braun and starring Käthe Gold, René Deltgen and Paul Wegener.

The screenplay was written by the director Veit Harlan. Harlan developed the project, but then turned over direction to his friend Braun.

The film was a wartime production, which began shooting in 1942 and was completed in 1944. Planned for a 1945 release, it was blocked by Joseph Goebbels who found the quality poor and disliked the fact that much of it was set in hospitals. It was eventually given a belated post-war release in 1951. By the time it was released, several of its cast members had died.

The film's sets were designed by the art directors Wilhelm Depenau and Alfred Tolle.

Cast
 Käthe Gold as Schwester Agnes
 René Deltgen as Günther Imhoff
 Paul Wegener as Prof. Mochmann
 Hans Schlenck as Dr. Lamprecht
 Ilse Petri as Milo Thiele
 Rudolf Schündler as Dr. Bertram
 Mady Rahl as Gerda Schirmer
 Albert Florath as Laboratoriumsdiener
 Maria Koppenhöfer as Oberschwester
 Gertrud Spalke
 Marina Werner-Papke
 Walter Pentzlin

See also
 Überläufer

References

Bibliography 
 Noack, Frank. Veit Harlan: The Life and Work of a Nazi Filmmaker. University Press of Kentucky, 2016.

External links 
 

1951 films
1951 drama films
German drama films
West German films
1950s German-language films
Films directed by Alfred Braun
UFA GmbH films
Films set in hospitals
Films about blind people
German black-and-white films
1950s German films